Lasse Brun Pedersen (born 1974) is a Danish mountain bike orienteering competitor and World Champion. He won an individual gold medal at the 2008 World MTB Orienteering Championships, and a gold medal in the relay.

References

External links
 

Danish orienteers
Male orienteers
Danish male cyclists
Mountain bike orienteers
1974 births
Living people
Place of birth missing (living people)